Kenny Malone (August 4, 1938 – August 26, 2021) was an American drummer and percussionist.

Life and career
Malone was born in Denver, Colorado. From the 1970s onwards, he was a prominent session musician in folk, country and many other acoustic-based genres. He was known for inventing his own style of hand drumming.

Throughout his career, Malone was asked to record for artists such as Carl Perkins, Ray Charles, George Jones, Janie Fricke, Johnny Cash, Don Williams, Dobie Gray, Donna Fargo, David Allen Coe, Merle Haggard, The Whites, Crystal Gayle, Charley Pride, Moe Bandy, Floyd Cramer, Dr. Hook, Barbara Mandrell, Johnny Paycheck, Kenny Rogers, Michael Johnson, Dottie West, Lynn Anderson, John Hartford, New Grass Revival, Béla Fleck, Barefoot Jerry, B.J. Thomas, Bobby Bare, Emmylou Harris, Ricky Skaggs, J. J. Cale, John Anderson, Dolly Parton, and Lacy J. Dalton. He provided percussion on the hits "Jolene" by Dolly Parton in 1973, and "Don't It Make My Brown Eyes Blue" by Crystal Gayle in 1977.

He died from COVID-19 on August 26, 2021, at age 83, during the COVID-19 pandemic in Tennessee.

References

External links
 

1938 births
2021 deaths
American folk musicians
American country drummers
Musicians from Denver
Country musicians from Colorado
United States Navy Band musicians
Deaths from the COVID-19 pandemic in Tennessee